Neoorthogonius orientalis is a species of beetles in the family Carabidae, the only species in the genus Neoorthogonius.

References

Orthogoniinae
Monotypic Carabidae genera